Chervena Zvezda Sofia (also known as Red Star Sofia) is an ice hockey team in Sofia, Bulgaria. They played only in the 2007-08 and 2019-20 seasons of the Bulgarian Hockey League.

History
The club was founded in 2002. They participated in Group B of the Bulgarian Hockey League for the 2007-08 and 2019-20. In 2007-08, they finished in second place with a record of four wins and two losses. 

Chervena Zvezda Sofia now consists only of junior teams.

References

External links
Team profile on eurohockey.net

Bulgarian Hockey League teams
Ice hockey teams in Bulgaria